Perigiali is a seaside village in Corinthia, Greece. It was the seat of the former municipality of Assos-Lechaio. Its population at the 2011 census was 1,616.

References

Populated places in Corinthia